Escobar is a town in Escobar District, Paraguarí Department of Paraguay, located some 14 km Paraguarí by Route Villarrica in Paraguarí.

Etymology 

The town took this name in honor of President Gral. Patricio Escobar. He was one of the heroes of the Paraguayan War and president of Paraguay in the late 19th century.

Before its founding by decree, was called "Yukeri."

Weather 

The average temperature is 21 °C, the highest in 39 the summer and the lowest in winter, 2.

Demography 

Escobar has a total of 8,815 inhabitants, of which 4,645 males and 4,170 females, according to estimates by the Directorate General of Statistics, Census and Surveys.

Economy 

Mainly dedicated to agriculture: cotton, corn, bean, manioc, sugarcane, and sweet potato.

Another economic activity is also cattle rising.

Colleges 

 Elementary School No. 669 "Lic. Rosa Marin de Gamarra"
 School "Emancipación Nacional"

Transportation 

Escobar is located 78 km from Asuncion and 12 km Paraguarí, a branch of Route I Mariscal Francisco Solano López because this can also lead to diversion Sapucaí and Caballero.

Tourism 

It has a Health Centre, Police and Post Office. Several rural areas are part of District Escobar: Arroyo Pora, Chircal, Guazú-Cua, Mbocayaty, General Aquino.

It has an area of pools, spa Itá Coty, which offers a cool stream, down from the hills, surrounded by abundant vegetation and stones. Visitors can go on camping; there are canteens and sports fields to enjoy a pleasant experience.

It has a centuries-old "train station".

On October 1 patronal feast of Santa Teresa del Niño Jesús is made a procession through the main streets of the town, with caravan riders and the patron saints of the various chapels of companies Escobar.

Notable people 

Emigdio Ayala Báez, composer and musician, author of "Mi dicha lejana" and "A mi pueblito Escobar."

References 

 Illustrated Geography of Paraguay, SRL Distributed Arami, 2007. 
 Geography of Paraguay, First Edition 1999, Publisher Hispanic Paraguay SRL.

External links 

 National Secretary of Tourism
 Directorate General for Surveys, Statistics and Census
 Coord. geographical and satellite imageryEscobar
 Asociados Virtual Library of Paraguay

Populated places in the Paraguarí Department